Untitled (referred to in Spotify as Split LP) is a split EP by British rock bands Thought Forms and Esben and the Witch, which was released on 7 April 2014 through Invada Records. It was also released as a digital download and on 12" silver vinyl, limited to 500 copies. The EP contains four songs by Thought Forms and two songs by Esben and the Witch, and the songs "Sound of Violence" by Thought Forms and "No Dog" by Esben and the Witch were uploaded to SoundCloud.

Track listings 
A side (Thought Forms)
Your Bones
Sound of Violence
For the Moving Stars
Silver Kiss

B side (Esben and the Witch)
No Dog
Butoh

References 

2014 EPs
Split EPs